Aleksandr Aleksandrovich Yezhevsky (– 15 January 2017) was a Soviet statesman, minister of tractor and agricultural machinery (tractor and agricultural engineering) of the USSR (1980-1988). He was born in Tulun, Irkutsk Governorate, Russian Empire.

Since 2004, he had been Chief Researcher of All-Russian Research Institute of Technology, repair and maintenance of machines and tractors (GOSNITI).

He was awarded the Order "For Merit to the Fatherland" 2nd (2015) and 4th class (1995). In 2017, he died in Moscow at the age of 101.

References

External links
 Министры советской эпохи

1915 births
2017 deaths
20th-century Russian engineers
People from Irkutsk Governorate
Central Committee of the Communist Party of the Soviet Union members
People's commissars and ministers of the Soviet Union
Seventh convocation members of the Soviet of the Union
Eighth convocation members of the Soviet of the Union
Ninth convocation members of the Soviet of the Union
Tenth convocation members of the Soviet of the Union
Eleventh convocation members of the Soviet of the Union
Heroes of Socialist Labour
Recipients of the Order "For Merit to the Fatherland", 2nd class
Recipients of the Order "For Merit to the Fatherland", 4th class
Recipients of the Order of Lenin
Recipients of the Order of the Red Banner of Labour
Men centenarians
Russian centenarians
Russian mechanical engineers
Soviet mechanical engineers
Burials at Novodevichy Cemetery